Arthur Valentijn Japin (born 26 July 1956 in Haarlem) is a Dutch novelist.

Biography
His parents were Bert Japin, a teacher and writer of detective novels, and Annie Japin-van Arnhem. After a difficult childhood—his father killed himself when Arthur was twelve years old—Japin entered the Kleinkunstacademie in Amsterdam, where he trained as an actor. He was also briefly an opera singer at De Nederlandse Opera in Amsterdam.

His first novel, De zwarte met het witte hart (1997), translated as The Two Hearts of Kwasi Boachi, was the story of two Ashanti princes, Kwame Poku and Kwasi Boachi, who were taken from today's Ghana and taken to the court of the Dutch king Willem I in 1837. The book became a bestseller and is considered a classic of modern Dutch literature. In November 2007, an opera based on the novel premiered in Rotterdam, with an English libretto by Arthur Japin and music by the British composer Jonathan Dove.

His second book, De droom van de leeuw (2002), is a novelized version of his relationship with the Dutch actress and novelist Rosita Steenbeek in Rome, where Steenbeek became the last lover of the Italian director Federico Fellini. His third novel, Een schitterend gebrek, translated as In Lucia's Eyes (2003), was a return to the historical novel, about Casanova's first lover, Lucia, who, he reports in his memoirs, inexplicably abandoned him in his youth, only to resurface years later as a hideous prostitute in an Amsterdam brothel. Japin was hailed as a great writer after his first couple of novels already, a status confirmed when he was asked to write the 2006 Boekenweekgeschenk: De grote wereld is a novella about a pair of circus-performing dwarves caught in Nazi Germany, which had a record first printing of 813,000 copies.

His 2007 novel De overgave, to be translated as Someone Found, takes the subject of the 19th-century Texas–Indian wars, dramatizing the story of the Fort Parker Massacre of 1836, in which a white girl, Cynthia Ann Parker, was taken as a Comanche hostage, later becoming the mother of the famous Comanche chief Quanah Parker.

Japin has also published several volumes of stories. The first two, Magonische verhalen and De vierde wand, were gathered into the omnibus Alle verhalen (2005). Magonische verhalen was made into the film Magonia by the Dutch director Ineke Smits. He has won almost every prestigious prize in Dutch literature, including the Libris Prize for Een schitterend gebrek.

Personal life
Japin lives in Utrecht with his publicist Lex Jansen and his partner Benjamin Moser, an American writer.

Bibliography
 1991: Heijermans!, a play, published by Het Nederlands Volkstoneel
 1996: Magonische verhalen 
 1997: De zwarte met het witte hart, novel, translated as The Two Hearts of Kwasi Boachi
 1998: De vierde wand, travel stories
 2001: Magonia, screenplay (based upon several of the ‘Magonische verhalen’)
 2002: De droom van de leeuw, novel 
 2002: De vrouwen van Lemnos, choreographical screenplay
 2003: Een schitterend gebrek, novel, translated as In Lucia's Eyes  
 2004: Dooi & Zeep, two stories illustrated by Arthur Japin, published by Uitgeverij Brokaat 
 2006: De klank van sneeuw, two stories
 2006: De grote wereld, Book Week Gift
 2007: De overgave, novel, winner of the 2008 NS Publieksprijs, translated as Someone Found
 2010: Vaslav, novel
 2012: Maar buiten is het feest, novel
 2013: De man van je leven, novel
 2015: De gevleugelde, novel
 2017: Kolja, novel
 2020: Mrs. Degas, novel
(except as noted, all published by De Arbeiderspers, Amsterdam)

Japin has also written several screenplays, radio plays, songs, and theater pieces.  His songs have appeared on the CDs Vol verlangen and Nuances van Liefde, sung by Astrid Seriese.

Prizes
 1990 - Gorcumse Literatuurprijs for De klap van Ediep Koning
 1995 - LIRA-prijs for De roering van het kielzog
 1995 - Literaire prijs van de provincie Gelderland for De draden van Anansi
 1998 - Lucy B. en C.W. van der Hoogtprijs for De zwarte met het witte hart
 1998 - Halewijn-literatuurprijs van de stad Roermond for the body of his work
 1999 - ECI-prijs voor Schrijvers van Nu for De zwarte met het witte hart
 2004 - Libris literatuurprijs for Een schitterend gebrek
 2005 - De Inktaap for Een schitterend gebrek
 2008 - NS Publieksprijs for De overgave

Film
 1996: Hoerenpreek, a television film by Ineke Smits
 1996: De Wolkenfabriek, a television film by Ineke Smits
 2000: Magonia, film version of Magonische verhalen by Ineke Smits, starring Dirk Roofthooft, Willem Voogd, Jack Wouterse, Linda van Dyck and Ramsey Nasr; also on DVD.

Television
Japin hosted the Dutch adaptation of the British panel game QI. The first episode was broadcast on 27 December 2008 but the series was discontinued after only six episodes.

References

External links
 Official website

1956 births
Living people
20th-century Dutch novelists
20th-century Dutch male writers
21st-century Dutch novelists
Dutch male novelists
Libris Prize winners
People from Haarlem
Dutch LGBT novelists
21st-century Dutch male writers
21st-century Dutch LGBT people